Old Dyrskartunnel (Norwegian: Gamle Dyrskartunnel) is a road tunnel in Odda municipality in Hordaland county, Norway. The tunnel was built in 1900 and is one of the oldest road tunnels in Norway.  Earlier, the main road over the mountains between Haugesund in Vestlandet and Østlandet (the capital of Oslo) went through the tunnel.  The current European route E134 pass through the newer Haukeli tunnel in a parallel corridor.  The Old Dyreskartunnel is located on the slope above the current tunnel.

History 
The oldest of the three former road routes in the area opened in 1886 without the tunnel, but it was commenced shortly thereafter and the tunnel opened in 1900.  The tunnel is about 60 feet long, for a large part hewn out of the rock, but with a natural stone arch in the south end. It was built to improve conditions in winter due to heavy snow and high avalanche danger.

The tunnel was only used for 19 years, in 1919 the road corridor was shifted to the other side of the mountain pass.

Access 
Perhaps the easiest, not the shortest, but the finest access is to park at the highest point on the road through Dyrskar. It contains a monument that marks the height, and then follow the old road back to the tunnel. Along this way you get a nice view of Dyrskar and the lake Ulevåvatn.

Gallery

References 

Odda
Old tunnels in Norway